Antonio del Buffalo, O.F.M. or Antonio Geremia de Bufalo (1619–1677) was a Roman Catholic prelate who served as Bishop of Gallipoli (1668–1677), Auxiliary Bishop of Sigüenza (1666–1668), and Auxiliary Bishop of Toledo (1661–1666).

Biography
Antonio del Buffalo was born in Vallata, Italy in 1619 and ordained a priest in the Order of Friars Minor.
On 5 March 1660, he was selected by the King of Spain and confirmed on 8 August 1661 by Pope Alexander VII as Auxiliary Bishop of Toledo and Titular Bishop of Temnus.
On 19 February 1662, he was consecrated bishop by Georges d'Aubusson de la Feuillade, Archbishop of Embrun, with Luis de Morales (bishop), Titular Bishop of Troas, and Miguel Pérez Cevallos, Titular Bishop of Arcadiopolis in Asia, serving as co-consecrators. 
In 1666, he was appointed during the papacy of Pope Alexander VII as Auxiliary Bishop of Sigüenza.
On 14 May 1668, he was appointed during the papacy of Pope Clement IX as Bishop of Gallipoli.
He served as Bishop of Gallipoli until his death on 25 September 1677.

Episcopal succession
While bishop, he was the principal consecrator of:
Antonio Rodríguez Castañon, Bishop of Ciudad Rodrigo (1662);
and the principal co-consecrator of:
Dionisio Pérez Escobosa, Bishop of Mondoñedo (1663);
Lorenzo de Sotomayor, Bishop of Zamora (1663);
Francisco Rodríguez Castañón, Bishop of Orense (1664);
Benito de Rivas, Bishop of Puerto Rico (1664);
Alfonso Vázquez de Toledo, Bishop of Cádiz (1664); and
Ambrosio Ignacio Spínola y Guzmán,  Bishop of Oviedo (1665).

References

External links and additional sources
 (for Chronology of Bishops) 
 (for Chronology of Bishops) 

17th-century Roman Catholic bishops in Spain
Bishops appointed by Pope Alexander VII
Bishops appointed by Pope Clement IX
People from the Province of Avellino
1619 births
1677 deaths
Franciscan bishops
17th-century Italian Roman Catholic bishops